Cary Lee Conklin (born February 29, 1968) is a former American football quarterback in the National Football League (NFL) for the Washington Redskins and the San Francisco 49ers.  

Born and raised in Yakima, Washington, Conklin graduated from its Eisenhower High School in 1986. He played college football at the University of Washington in Seattle under head coach Don James and was selected in the fourth round of the 1990 NFL Draft.

See also
 Washington Huskies football statistical leaders

References

1968 births
Living people
American football quarterbacks
San Francisco 49ers players
Washington Huskies football players
Washington Redskins players
Sportspeople from Yakima, Washington
Players of American football from Washington (state)
Washington Huskies football coaches